José Carlos Ferreira Júnior (born 1 February 1995), commonly known as Juninho, is a Brazilian professional footballer who plays as a centre-back for Danish Superliga club FC Midtjylland.

Club career

Coritiba
Born in Londrina, Paraná, Juninho graduated with Coritiba's youth setup, after starting it out at Junior Team. On 6 July 2015 he was promoted to the main squad, after spending a year with the under-23s.

On 26 July 2015 Juninho made his Série A debut, starting in a 1–1 home draw against Corinthians. He became a regular starter in the following campaign, scoring his first professional goal on 2 June 2016 in a 3–4 home loss against Chapecoense.

Palmeiras
On 13 May 2017, Juninho signed for fellow top tier club Palmeiras until 2022, for a fee of €3 million for 40% of his federative rights.

Loan to Atlético Mineiro
On 27 April 2018, Palmeiras reached an agreement for Juninho to join Atlético Mineiro on loan until the end of the season.

Midtjylland
On 13 July 2021 it was confirmed, that Juninho had signed a five-year deal with Danish Superliga club FC Midtjylland.

Career statistics

References

External links

Profile at the FC Midtjylland website
Coritiba official profile 

1995 births
Living people
Sportspeople from Londrina
Brazilian footballers
Brazilian expatriate footballers
Association football defenders
Campeonato Brasileiro Série A players
Coritiba Foot Ball Club players
Sociedade Esportiva Palmeiras players
Clube Atlético Mineiro players
Esporte Clube Bahia players
FC Midtjylland players
Brazilian expatriate sportspeople in Denmark
Expatriate men's footballers in Denmark